Aiken Regional Airport  is a city-owned public-use airport located five nautical miles (9 km) north of the central business district of Aiken, a city in Aiken County, South Carolina, United States. The airport serves the general aviation community, with no scheduled commercial airline service. Formerly, it was Aiken Air Force Station.

Facilities and aircraft
It has two asphalt paved runways: 7/25 is 5,500 by 100 feet (1,676 x 30 m) and 1/19 is 3,800 by 75 feet (1,158 x 23 m).

For the 12-month period ending 11 March 2019, the airport had 28,300 aircraft operations, an average of 78 per day: 93% general aviation, 6% air taxi and 1% military. At that time there were 10 aircraft based at this airport, all single-engine.

See also
List of airports in South Carolina

References

External links
Aiken Regional Airport, official website
Aiken Aviation Enterprises, the fixed-base operator

Airports established in 1942
Buildings and structures in Aiken, South Carolina
Airports in South Carolina
Transportation in Aiken County, South Carolina
1942 establishments in South Carolina

ms:Lapangan Terbang Antarabangsa Guarani